Diana, Our Mother: Her Life and Legacy is a 2017 documentary film broadcast in the United Kingdom by ITV on 24 July 2017 and the United States by HBO on 24 July 2017. It will also air on Seven Network in Australia, CBC in Canada, Three in New Zealand, NRK in Norway, YLE in Finland and TV2 in Denmark. It aired on 20 August 2017 on CBC News Network.

The documentary was one of two documentaries commissioned by Prince William and Prince Harry to mark the 20th anniversary of the death of their mother, Diana, Princess of Wales, and features interviews from the two princes, as well as the late princess' friends and family such as Sir Elton John and Charles Spencer. It includes previously unseen photographs, archival footage and home movies from Diana's childhood. The film focuses on the impact of Diana on her two sons and on numerous causes she was involved in her adult life such as AIDS, landmines, homelessness and cancer.

The documentary drew around seven million viewers in the UK – the most watched show television programme of the day in the United Kingdom and also the most watched factual of ITV since 2009.

Cast 
 Diana, the late Princess of Wales, née Spencer
 Prince William, Prince of Wales
 Prince Harry
 Charles Spencer, 9th Earl Spencer
 Sir Elton John
 Harry Herbert
 Lady Carolyn Warren
 William van Straubenzee
 Gerard McGrath
 Jayne Fincher
 Anna Harvey
 Victor, Lord Adebowale
 Prof. Jerry White 
 Dr. Ken Rutherford
 Graham Dillamore

Reception 
On Rotten Tomatoes, the film has an approval rating of 90% based on 10 reviews, with an average rating of 7.8/10. On Metacritic, the film has a score of 77 out of 100, based on 6 critics, indicating "generally favorable" reviews.

See also
 Diana, 7 Days, the second 2017 documentary commissioned by the sons.

References 

Documentary films about British royalty
British documentary films
Films set in the United Kingdom
Films set in the 20th century
2017 television films
2017 films
Films about Diana, Princess of Wales
2010s British films